Miloš Perišić (born 2 April 1995) is a Serbian football defender who last played for Farense.

Club career
Perišić signed his first professional contract with Partizan in 2015, after coming through their youth ranks.

References

External links
 
 

1995 births
Living people
Sportspeople from Knin
Serbs of Croatia
People from the Republic of Serbian Krajina
Serbian footballers
Association football defenders
FK Partizan players
FK Teleoptik players
FK Sinđelić Beograd players
FK Radnički Pirot players
FK Borac Čačak players
Serbian First League players
Serbian SuperLiga players
Serbian expatriate footballers
Serbian expatriate sportspeople in Portugal
Expatriate footballers in Portugal
S.C. Farense players